Cher in Concert, also known as the Take Me Home Tour, was the first solo concert tour by American singer-actress Cher. The tour's debut was at Sahara Reno in Reno, Nevada with a huge production and cast put together by Joe Layton, who did the same for Bette Midler's "Clams On A Half Shell" and Diana Ross previously.
Cher premiered her one-woman show at the Opera House Theatre June 6 throught 19. This is the first time Cher has appeared solo on the nightclub circuit. 

The show then became Cher's first world concert tour as a solo artist. The tour reached North America, Europe, South Africa and Australia.
The concert was filmed in Monte Carlo on May 10, 1980 and broadcast on HBO the following February and later taped in Las Vegas in 1981 at Caesars Palace for a broadcast on Showtime on April 21, 1983.

Background
The show featured three backing singers, six dancers, three drag queens as Bette Midler, Cher, and Diana Ross, a mechanical bull and twelve costume changes.

Cher described the show as "a bit Sonny & Cher-ish" a mixture of cabaret, disco and rock'n'roll. With twelve changes of clothes, Cher wore no costume for more than eight minutes.

The concerts were based in part on her solo television shows The Cher Show, Cher... Special and Cher... and others Fantasies. 
During Cher's costume changes, drag performers Kenny Sacha, as Bette Midler and J.C. Gaynor as Diana Ross performed "In the Mood" and "I'm Coming Out" respectively.  Cher joined them to end the show with a performance of "Friends". Russell Elliott opened the show as Cher.

Set list
"Ain't Nobody's Business"
"Signed, Sealed, Delivered I'm Yours"
"Fire"
"Easy To Be Hard"
"The Way of Love"
"Ain't No Mountain High Enough" (performed by J.C. Gaynor and Cher)
"Boogie Woogie Bugle Boy" (performed by Kenny Sacha)
"Friends" (performed by Sacha, Gaynor, and Cher)
"Jailhouse Rock" / "Dream Lover" / "Great Balls Of Fire"
"Rockin' Robin"
"Johnny B. Goode"
"Dedicated to the One I Love"
"Hand Jive" / "Honky Tonk Women" / "Old Time Rock and Roll"
"Take It to the Limit"
"Take Me Home"
"Takin' It to the Streets"
"Ain't Got No Money"

Tour dates

Cancellations and rescheduled shows

A Celebration at Caesars Palace

A Celebration at Caesars Palace was the first concert residency by Cher. Shows were performed at the Circus Maximus Showroom at Caesars Palace in Las Vegas (show time were 9:00 pm and 12:30 pm). Shows from September 25 to October 2, 1980 were performed at the Stateline Showroom at Caesars Tahoe in Stateline, Nevada. The premiere concert was on June 29, 1979.

Set list
"Could I Be Dreaming"
"Signed, Sealed, Delivered I'm Yours"
"You Make My Dreams"
"Da Ya Think I'm Sexy?"
"Those Shoes"
"Out Here On My Own"
"Take It to the Limit"
"I'm Coming Out" (performed by J.C. Gaynor)
"In the Mood" (performed by Kenny Sacha)
"Friends" (performed by Sacha, Gaynor and Cher)
"Lookin' for Love" (contains elements of "Devil Went Down to Georgia") 
"When Will I Be Loved"
"More Than You Know"
"Fame"

Residency dates

1979

1980

1981

1982

Broadcasts and recordings
The Monte Carlo Show (20th Century Fox Television; aired September 14, 1980)
Standing Room Only: Cher in Concert (HBO; aired February 8, 1981)
Cher... A Celebration at Caesars (Showtime; aired April 21, 1983)

Personnel

 Lead vocals: Cher
 Background vocals: Michelle Aller
 Background vocals: Warren Ham
 Background vocals: Petsye Powell
 Produced and Staged: Joe Layton
 Musical Director: Gary Scott 
 Dancer: Wayne Bascomb
 Dancer: Damita Jo Freeman
 Dancer: Warren Lucas
 Dancer: Mykal Perea
 Dancer: Randy Wander
 Impersonators
 Kenny Sacha as Bette Midler
 Russel Elliot as Cher (in the interlude)
 J.C. Gaynor as Diana Ross
 Costumes
Costumes Designed: Bob Mackie
Wardrobe: Alan Trugman
Wardrobe: Debbie Paull
Wigs: Renata
 Band
Saxophone: Warren Ham
Drums: Gary Ferguson 
Guitarist: Ron "Rocket" Ritchotte
Ken Rarick
Bob Parr

References

External links
Official Cher site

Cher concert tours
1979 concert tours
1980 concert tours
1981 concert tours
Cher concert residencies